Sokolinaya Gora may refer to:
Sokolinaya Gora District, a district in Moscow, Russia
Sokolinaya Gora (Moscow Metro), a station of the Moscow Metro, Moscow, Russia